Skogie may refer to:

Carl Skoglund (1884—1960), Swedish-American socialist and political figure
Skogie, nickname of Freddy Moore (born 1950), American rock musician
Skogie, a name of Moore's rock band
Skogie and the Flaming Pachucos, a name of Moore's rock band